(January 1, 1951 – March 9, 2021) was a Japanese jazz drummer and session musician.

Career 
Murakami was born in Nishinomiya. He first learned to play French horn, but switched to classical percussion as a teenager before settling on the drum kit. He worked extensively as a sideman on jazz sessions in the 1970s and 1980s, with, among others, Sadao Watanabe, Yosuke Yamashita, Kazumi Watanabe, Akira Sakata, and Takashi Kako. He founded the group Ponta Box (featuring sidemen Masahiro Sayama and Masatoshi Mizuno), which recorded three albums for JVC Victor and appeared at the 1995 Montreux Jazz Festival, and has recorded several albums under his own name. He also worked as a session musician for J-pop stars for several decades.

Murakami died on March 9, 2021, after suffering thalamic bleeding at the age of 70. A year later, a tribute concert titled "One Last Live" was held at the Tokyo International Forum, featuring Junk Fujiyama, Yo Hitoto, Fusanosuke Kondo, Maki Ohguro, Miho Fukuhara, Chisato Moritaka, Chikuzen Sato, Taeko Onuki, Mie, and Toshiki Kadomatsu.

Discography
As leader
Introducing Ponta Murakami (Toshiba, 1976)
Tokyo Fusion Night (Polydor, 1978)
Welcome To My Life (JVC, 1998)
Rhythm Monster (Universal Music, 2012)

with Ponta Box
Ponta Box (JVC, 1995)
Desert in the Desert (JVC, 1995)
NYPB (JVC, 2001)

References

Japanese jazz drummers
Japanese session musicians
1951 births
2021 deaths
People from Nishinomiya
Fellows of the American Physical Society